Dorfee is an unincorporated community in Clay County, West Virginia, United States. Its post office has been closed.

Dorfee was most likely derived from the name D'Urfee.

References 

Unincorporated communities in West Virginia
Unincorporated communities in Clay County, West Virginia
Charleston, West Virginia metropolitan area